Petre Roman (born 22 July 1946) is a Romanian engineer and politician who was Prime Minister of Romania from 1989 to 1991, when his government was overthrown by the intervention of the miners led by Miron Cozma. He was the first prime minister since 1945 who was not a Communist or fellow traveler (Communist sympathiser). He was also the president of the Senate from 1996 to 1999 and Minister of Foreign Affairs from 1999 to 2000.

He was the leader of the Democratic Force (FD) party, which he founded after leaving the Democratic Party (PD) in 2003. Currently, he is an MP in the Lower Chamber, elected in 2012. He had been removed from his seat in 2015 after being charged by the National Integrity Agency with incompatibility, but restored to office in 2016 after the Court of Appeals overturned the ruling. He is also a member of the Club of Madrid, a group of more than 80 democratic former statesmen, which works to strengthen democratic governance and leadership.

Background
Petre Roman was born in Bucharest. His father, Valter Roman, born Ernst or Ernő Neuländer of Transylvanian Hungarian-Jewish descent, was a veteran of the Spanish Civil War, a Comintern activist, and a prominent member of the Romanian Communist Party (PCR). His mother Hortensia Vallejo was a Spaniard exiled who would become director of the Spanish section of Radio Romania International. The couple married in Moscow, and he has several siblings. In 1974 Roman married Mioara Georgescu, with whom he has a daughter, Oana. In February 2007, husband and wife confirmed that they were divorcing; the divorce was made final on Good Friday, 6 April 2007. In June 2009, he married a pregnant Silvia Chifiriuc (who is 26 years his junior) in a Romanian Orthodox wedding.

Roman first rose to prominence during the Romanian Revolution of 1989, when he was among the crowd occupying the National Television building, and broadcasting messages expressing revolutionary triumph. He became provisional prime minister after the overthrow of the Communist regime, and was confirmed in office in June 1990, three months after the country's first free election in 53 years.

During the Romanian Revolution 

Petre Roman was heavily involved in the Romanian Revolution of 1989 as a member of the National Salvation Front (FSN), both as a revolutionary and as a leading political figure. Given that the revolution was led by politicians united not by a cohesive ideology, but by resentment towards the Ceaușescu regime, in-fighting soon began, especially between its leaders, namely, centre-left liberal Dumitru Mazilu, who wished to instill capitalism, and neo-communist Ion Iliescu, who wanted to keep communism/hard line socialism, but remove Ceaușescu. 

As a left-wing socialist, Petre Roman was largely the middle ground between the world-views of his colleagues, as he wanted to replace the Marxist view of socialism as a transitory stage with a more democratic understanding of socialism.

Revolutionary activity 

Petre Roman participated directly in the Romanian Revolution forming a barricade in the centre of Bucharest from the days of 21 and 22 December. On 22 December 1989, Petre Roman spoke from the balcony of the headquarters of the Central Committee against the Ceaușescu regime, the first public demonstration of its kind. 

On 22 December, he became a member of the Provisional Council of the National Salvation Front (CPFSN) established for the coordination of the revolutionary process and the establishment of democracy once the revolution had concluded.

Prime Minister 

On 26 December 1989, Roman was appointed as provisional Prime Minister of the provisional FSN government. At the 20 May 1990 elections–the first free elections held in the country in 53 years and colloquially known as the "Blindman's Sunday"–he was elected as a deputy from Bucharest on the FSN list. 

Shortly afterwards, then President Iliescu designated him once more as Prime Minister on 20 June. He was formally confirmed in office by the newly elected legislature of the parliament on 28 June and his governing program was subsequently approved unanimously.

Electoral history

Presidential elections

Notes

External links
 (site down as of 12 November 2008)
fragments from Petre Roman's book "Libertatea ca datorie", ed. Dacia- Cluj,  1994

 

1946 births
Living people
Politicians from Bucharest
Romanian people of Hungarian-Jewish descent
Romanian people of Spanish descent
Members of the Romanian Orthodox Church
Eastern Orthodox Christians from Romania
National Salvation Front (Romania) politicians
Democratic Party (Romania) politicians
Democratic Liberal Party (Romania) politicians
Prime Ministers of Romania
Romanian Ministers of Foreign Affairs
Members of the Chamber of Deputies (Romania)
Presidents of the Senate of Romania
Members of the Senate of Romania
Candidates for President of Romania
People of the Romanian Revolution
Romanian socialists
Politehnica University of Bucharest alumni
Romanian democracy activists
Mineriads
Fluid dynamicists
Romanian Communist Party politicians